Hermann Julius Höfle, also Hans (or) Hermann Hoefle (19 June 1911 – 21 August 1962), was an Austrian-born SS commander and Holocaust perpetrator during the Nazi era. He was deputy to Odilo Globočnik in the Aktion Reinhard program, serving as his main deportation and extermination expert. Arrested in 1961 in connection with these crimes, Höfle committed suicide by hanging in prison before he was tried.

SS career 
Born in Salzburg, Austria, Höfle joined the NSDAP on 1 August 1933, with party number 307,469.  He joined the SS at the same time.  Before the war, he worked as an auto mechanic.

Crimes against humanity 
After the conquest of Poland, Höfle served in Nowy Sącz, in Southern Poland. In November 1940 he served as an overseer of a Jewish labour camp southeast of Lublin. Up to December 1941 Höfle was in Mogilev.  He was involved in deportations to the camps of Belzec, Sobibor, and Treblinka. He lived and worked from the Aktion Reinhard headquarters with the Julius Schreck Barracks, Ostland Strasse, in Lublin.

Höfle was "Coordinator" of Operation Reinhard and chief of staff to Odilo Globočnik, serving as his main deportation and extermination expert. Alongside Christian Wirth, Höfle had chief authority of Operation Reinhard beside Globočnik.  At the beginning of the operation, he held the rank of Hauptsturmführer (captain). SS members, including those from Action T4 who were assigned to the operation, reported to the headquarters in Lublin and were instructed to their duties by Höfle.  For an example of the limited paperwork, every member of Operation Reinhard signed the following declaration of secrecy:

As head of the "Main Department" (Hauptabteilung), Höfle was in charge of the organization and manpower of Operation Reinhard.  He coordinated the deportations of Jews from all areas of the General Government and directed them to one of the extermination camps. The deportation orders were coordinated and channeled through SS authorities from Höfle's office for the Lublin reservation, through the district SS and Police Leaders, down to the localities where the expulsions were to take place.

Around May 1942 in the General Government, a substitution policy developed for a short time in which Polish workers who were sent to the German Reich were gradually replaced with Jewish laborers.  It became standard procedure to stop deportation trains from the Reich and Slovakia in Lublin in order to select able-bodied Jews for work in the General Government, the others being sent on to their deaths in Belzec.  In this way, many Jews were temporarily spared death and instead relegated to forced labor.  Hermann Höfle was one of the chief supporters and implementers of this policy.

Höfle personally oversaw the deportation of the Warsaw Ghetto, the so-called Großaktion Warschau. The operation was preceded on 20 and 21 July 1942 by a spree of randomly killing actions along the streets of the Ghetto and by the arrest and brutal imprisonment of many others taken as hostages among counselors, department managers and those connected in a way or another to the Judenrat. All this was to intimidate and soften the Judenrat to the new upcoming measures.
The day after, in the morning of 22 July, Sturmbannführer Höfle, accompanied by an entourage of SS and government officials, arrived at the Judenrat in the Warsaw Ghetto and announced to the chairman, Adam Czerniaków, that the Jews, regardless of sex or age and with but a few exceptions, were to be evacuated to the East.  The exceptions were workers in German factories who had valid work permits, Judenrat employees, the Jewish Order Service, hospital patients and employees, and the families of the exempt.  The deportees were allowed to carry with them 15 kg of baggage, food for three days, money, gold, and other valuables.  The order also called for 6,000 Jews to report to the Umschlagplatz every day by 4 p.m. to board the trains for deportation.

Adam Czerniaków wrote in his diary on 22 July 1942 (he committed suicide the next day): 

Höfle also played a key role in the Harvest Festival massacre of Jewish inmates of the various labour camps in the Lublin district in early November 1943. Approximately 43,000 Jews were murdered during this operation which was the single largest German massacre of Jews in the entire war. Höfle rejoined Globočnik in Trieste, after various missions in the Netherlands and Belgium.

Höfle Telegram

On 11 January 1943, Höfle sent a radiogram from Lublin to SS-Obersturmbannführer Franz Heim in Kraków, who was at the time the deputy commander of the Security Police and SD in the General Government, and to SS-Obersturmbannführer Adolf Eichmann in Berlin.  The message documented the total deportations of Jews to the four Operation Reinhard camps through 31 of December 1942.  Today this document is called the Höfle Telegram.

After the war; arrest and suicide
On 31 May 1945 Höfle was found hiding in Möslacher Alm near the Weissensee Lake in Carinthia (Southern Austria) by the British, along with SS-Gruppenführer Odilo Globocnik, and  SS-Sturmbannführers Ernst Lerch and Georg Michalsen. After two years in the British interrogation center Wolfsberg (Carinthia), he was released to the Austrian judicial system. On 30 October 1947, under oath, he was released to continue his earlier occupation as an auto mechanic in his birthplace, Salzburg.

After an extradition request on 9 July 1948 by the Polish government, he fled to Italy, where he lived under a false name until 1951. Later he returned to Austria and then emigrated to the Federal Republic of Germany. There he was employed briefly as an informant for U.S. Army Counterintelligence.

Höfle returned to Salzburg, where he lived as a free man until 2 January 1961, when he was arrested by the Austrian authorities and sent to prison in Vienna, where in 1962 he hanged himself before his trial could begin.

See also

 List of people who died by suicide by hanging

References

Literature
  1999 edition in  Google book.
 
 
 
 
 Peter Witte, Stephen Tyas: A New Document on the Deportation and Murder of Jews during "Einsatz Reinhardt" 1942. In: Holocaust and Genocide Studies 15 (2001), S. 468-486
 Josef Wulf: Das Dritte Reich und seine Vollstrecker. K. G. Saur Verlag KG, München 1978, S. 275-287

1911 births
1962 suicides
Military personnel from Salzburg
Austrian people who died in prison custody
Holocaust perpetrators in Poland
Mechanics (people)
Nazis who committed suicide in Austria
Suicides by hanging in Austria
Nazis who committed suicide in prison custody
Operation Reinhard
SS-Sturmbannführer
Waffen-SS personnel
Prisoners who died in Austrian detention
World War II prisoners of war held by the United Kingdom